In enzymology, carbon monoxide dehydrogenase (CODH) is an enzyme that catalyzes the chemical reaction

CO + H2O + A  CO2 + AH2

The chemical process catalyzed by carbon monoxide dehydrogenase is similar to the water-gas shift reaction.

The 3 substrates of this enzyme are CO, H2O, and A, whereas its two products are CO2 and AH2.

A variety of electron donors/receivers (Shown as "A" and "AH2" in the reaction equation above) are observed in micro-organisms which utilize CODH. Several examples of electron transfer cofactors has been proposed, including Ferredoxin, NADP+/NADPH and flavoprotein complexes like flavin adenine dinucleotide (FAD) as well as hydrogenases. CODHs support the metabolisms of diverse prokaryotes, including methanogens, aerobic carboxidotrophs, acetogens, sulfate-reducers, and hydrogenogenic bacteria. The bidirectional reaction catalyzed by CODH plays a role in the carbon cycle allowing organisms to both make use of CO as a source of energy and utilize CO2 as a source of carbon.  CODH can form a monofunctional enzyme, as is the case in Rhodospirillum rubrum, or can form a cluster with acetyl-CoA synthase as has been shown in M.thermoacetica. When acting in concert, either as structurally independent enzymes or in a bifunctional CODH/ACS unit, the two catalytic sites are key to carbon fixation in the reductive acetyl-CoA pathway Microbial organisms (Both aerobic and anaerobic) encode and synthesize CODH for the purpose of carbon fixation (CO oxidation and CO2 reduction). Depending on attached accessory proteins (A,B,C,D-Clusters), serve a variety of catalytic functions, including reduction of [4Fe-4S] clusters and insertion of nickel.

This enzyme belongs to the family of oxidoreductases, specifically those acting on the aldehyde or oxo group of donor with other acceptors.  The systematic name of this enzyme class is carbon-monoxide:acceptor oxidoreductase. Other names in common use include anaerobic carbon monoxide dehydrogenase, carbon monoxide oxygenase, carbon-monoxide dehydrogenase, and carbon-monoxide:(acceptor) oxidoreductase.

Diversity 
CODH are a rather diverse group of enzymes, containing two unrelated types of CODH. Aerobic carboxydotrophic bacteria utilize copper-molybdenum flavoenzymes,  containing a Mo-[2Fe-2S]-FAD active site. Anaerobic bacteria utilize nickel-iron based CODHs known to have an oxygen sensitive nature and a complex active site containing a [Ni-3Fe-4S] cluster and another distal Fe. Both classes of CODH catalyze the conversion of carbon monoxide (CO) to carbon dioxide (CO2). Only the Ni containing CODH is able to also catalyze the back reaction. CODHs exist in both monofunctional and bifunctional forms. An example for the latter case, Ni-CODHs form a bifunctional cluster with acetyl-CoA synthase, as has been well characterized in the anaerobic bacteria Moorella thermoacetica.

NiCODH 
Nickel containing CODH (NiCODH) can be further divided into structural clades, dependent on their phylogenetic relationship. Different annotations for the clades are around, a useful annotation, Clade A to G, with further structural sub groups inside each clade, was proposed by Inoue et al.

Structure 

[[Image:CODH M.thermoacetica.jpg|right|thumb|300px|Structure of CODH/ACS in M.thermoacetica." Alpha (ACS) and beta (CODH) subunits are shown.  (1)The A-cluster Ni-[4Fe-4S].  (2)C-cluster Ni-[3Fe-4S].  (3) B-Cluster [4Fe-4S].  (4) D-cluster [4Fe-4S]. Designed from ]]

Homodimeric Ni-CODH consists of five metal complexes referred to as clusters. Each differing in individual coordination geometry, presence of nickel, and location of the active site in either sub-unit α or β. Multiple research groups have proposed crystal structures for the α2β2 tetrameric enzyme CODH/ACS from the acetogenic bacteria M. thermoacetica, including two recent examples since 2009:  . The two β units are the site of CODH activity and form the central core of the enzyme.  In total, the 310 kDa enzyme contains seven iron-sulfur [4Fe-4S] clusters. Each α unit contains a single metal cluster. Together, the two β units contains five clusters of three types. CODH catalytic activity occurs at the Ni-[3Fe-4S] C-clusters while the interior [4Fe-4S] B and D clusters transfer electrons away from the C-cluster to external electron carriers such as ferredoxin. The ACS activity occurs in A-cluster located in the outer two α units.

A noteworthy feature of the M. thermoacetica CODH/ACS is an internal gas tunnel connecting the multiple active sites. The full role of the gas channel in regulating the rate catalytic activity is still a subject of investigation, but several studies support the notion that molecules of CO do in fact travel directly from the C-cluster to the ACS active site without leaving the enzyme. For instance, the rate of acetyl-CoA synthase activity in the bifunctional enzyme is not affected by the addition of hemoglobin, which would compete for CO in bulk solution, and isotopic labeling studies show that carbon monoxide derived from the C-cluster is preferentially used at the A-cluster over unlabeled CO in solution. Protein engineering of the CODH/ACS in  M.thermoacetica revealed that mutating residues, so as to functionally block the tunnel, stopped acety-CoA synthesis when only CO2 was present. The discovery of a functional CO tunnel places CODH on a growing list of enzymes that independently evolved this strategy to transfer reactive intermediates from one active site to another.

Many NiCODH exhibit this homodimeric structure, however, there also examples of functional monomeric NiCODH, such the one found in Rhodospirillum rubrum.

 Reaction mechanisms 

 Oxidative 
The CODH catalytic site, referred to as the C-cluster, is a [3Fe-4S] cluster bonded to a Ni-Fe moiety. Two basic amino acids (Lys587 and His 113 in M.thermoacetica'') reside in proximity to the C-cluster and facilitate acid-base chemistry required for enzyme activity.  Based on IR spectra suggesting the presence of an Ni-CO complex, the proposed first step in the oxidative catalysis of CO to CO2 involves the binding of CO to Ni2+ and corresponding complexing of Fe2+ to a water molecule.

The binding of CO molecule causes a shift in the coordination of the Ni atom from a square-planar to square pyramidal geometry. Dobbek et al. further propose that movement of the nickel atom's cysteine ligand brings the CO into close proximity to the hydroxyl group, and facilitate a base-catalyzed, nucleophillic attack by the iron-bound hydroxy group. A carboxy bridge between the Ni and Fe atom has been proposed as an intermediate. A decarboxylation leads to the release of CO2 and the reduction of the cluster. Although the resulting intermediate oxidation state of the Ni and the degree to which electrons are distributed throughout the Ni-[3Fe-4S] cluster is subject of some debate, the electrons in the reduced C-cluster are transferred to nearby B and D [4Fe-4S] clusters, returning the Ni-[3Fe-4S] C-cluster to an oxidized state and reducing the single electron carrier ferredoxin.

Reductive 

Given CODH's role in CO2 fixation, it is common in the biochemistry literature for the reductive mechanism to be inferred as the “direct reverse” of the oxidative mechanism by the ”principal of microreversibility.” In the process of reducing carbon dioxide, the enzyme's C-cluster must first be activated from an oxidized to a reduced state before the Ni-CO2 bond is formed.

Environmental relevance 

Carbon monoxide dehydrogenase is closely associated with the regulation of atmospheric CO and CO2 levels, maintaining optimal CO levels suitable for other forms of life. Microbial organisms rely on these enzymes for both energy conservation along with CO2 fixation. Often encoding for and synthesizing multiple unique forms of CODH for designated use. Further research into specific types of CODH show CO being used and condensed with CH3 (Methyl groups) to form Acetyl-CoA. Anaerobic micro-organisms like Acetogens undergo the Wood-Ljungdahl Pathway, relying on CODH to produce CO by reduction of CO2 needed for the synthesis of Acetyl-CoA from a methyl, coenzyme a (CoA) and corrinoid iron-sulfur protein. Other types show CODH being utilized to generate a proton motive force for the purposes of energy generation. CODH is used for the CO oxidation, producing two protons which are subsequently reduced to form dihydrogen (H2, known colloquially as molecular hydrogen), providing the necessary free energy to drive ATP generation.

References

Further reading 

 
 
 
 * *

 

EC 1.2.99
Iron enzymes
Zinc enzymes
Nickel enzymes
Iron-sulfur enzymes
Enzymes of known structure
Protein families
Dehydrogenase